Aan Piranna Veedu is a Malayalam comedy drama film written and directed by K. P. Sunil. It stars Kailash and Aswathy Ashok in the lead roles, with Innocent, Vinaya Prasad and Suraj Venjaramoodu doing other pivotal roles.

Cast
 Kailash as Jithin
 Aswathy Ashok as Priya
 Innocent as Ramachandran
 Vinaya Prasad as Jithin's mother
 Suraj Venjaramoodu as Albi
 Devan
 Ashokan
 Harishree Ashokan
 Geetha Vijayan
 Ramya Naidu
 Mamukkoya
 Edavela Babu
 Bijukuttan
 Anoop Chandran
 Kochu Preman
 Geetha Salam
 Ponnamma Babu
 Gayathri
 Anjana Appukuttan

Production
The filming is being completed at various parts of Kozhikode.

Soundtrack
The soundtrack of the film has been composed by M. Jayachandran with lyrics by Kaithapram. Madhu Balakrishnan, Sudheep Kumar, Swetha Mohan and Vijay Yesudas are the featured artists. The album is set to release in May 2011.

References

 
 

2010s Malayalam-language films
2011 comedy-drama films
Indian comedy-drama films
2011 films
Films scored by M. Jayachandran